Shahbaz Malik SI PP  (Punjabi: شہباز ملک, Urdu: شہباز ملک; born 3 April 1937) is a Pakistani writer, Radio Pakistan broadcaster, Punjab University Oriental College professor, bibliographer and research scholar. He has written 40 books on literature and the Punjabi language. The government of Pakistan awarded him the Pride of Performance award in 2003 and 2018, and the Sitara-i-Imtiaz in 2016.

References

http://www.pu.edu.pk/home/section/exam/5853

Pakistani scholars
1937 births
Punjabi people
Living people
Pakistani male poets
20th-century Pakistani male writers
Recipients of the Pride of Performance
Academic staff of the University of the Punjab
Writers from Lahore
Punjabi-language poets
Recipients of Sitara-i-Imtiaz